Bakhtawar Singh is an Indian athlete. He won a gold medal in the 50 Kilometre Walk in the 1951 New Delhi Asian games.

References

Athletes (track and field) at the 1951 Asian Games
Asian Games medalists in athletics (track and field)
Living people
Asian Games gold medalists for India
Medalists at the 1951 Asian Games
Indian male racewalkers
Year of birth missing (living people)